Morgantown Historic District, also known as Old Main Street Historic District, is a national historic district located in Caernarvon Township, Berks County, Pennsylvania.  The district encompasses 104 contributing buildings, 1 contributing structure, and 1 contributing object in the village of Morgantown built between about 1790 and 1945. It includes residential, commercial, and institutional buildings in a variety of popular architectural styles including Georgian and Late Victorian.  The oldest buildings are mostly built of brown sandstone.  A primarily residential district, notable non-residential buildings include a tavern / hotel (c. 1800), I.O.O.F. lodge / town meeting hall (1868), Morgantown Garage (1920), and fire hall (1921).  Also in the district are a contributing cemetery and war memorial.

It was listed on the National Register of Historic Places in 1995.

References

Historic districts on the National Register of Historic Places in Pennsylvania
Georgian architecture in Pennsylvania
Historic districts in Berks County, Pennsylvania
National Register of Historic Places in Berks County, Pennsylvania